Reedsville is a village in Manitowoc County, Wisconsin, United States. The population was 1,195 at the 2020 census.

History
The village was named after Judge George Reed, who, with his partner, Jacob Lueps, bought a section of land in the town of Maple Grove, Wisconsin. In 1854, they had the land platted and surveyed by George Wimpf, who laid out a village of 56 blocks. Early residents of the village were French Canadians and Menomonee Indians. Later, settlers from Germany, Bohemia, and Ireland came. The village was incorporated in 1892, when its population was 510.

Geography
Reedsville is located at  (44.153756, -87.955595).

Demographics

2010 census
As of the census of 2010, there were 1,206 people, 472 households, and 322 families living in the village. The racial makeup of the village was 90.5% White, 2.1% Native American, 6.5% from other races, and 1.0% from two or more races. Hispanic or Latino of any race were 7.8% of the population.

There were 472 households, of which 32.4% had children under the age of 18 living with them, 57.0% were married couples living together, 6.4% had a female householder with no husband present, 4.9% had a male householder with no wife present, and 31.8% were non-families. 26.7% of all households were made up of individuals, and 11.3% had someone living alone who was 65 years of age or older. The average household size was 2.56 and the average family size was 3.13.

The median age in the village was 37.4 years. 27% of residents were under the age of 18; 6.7% were between the ages of 18 and 24; 27% were from 25 to 44; 25.5% were from 45 to 64; and 13.8% were 65 years of age or older. The gender makeup of the village was 50.7% male and 49.3% female.

2000 census
As of the census of 2000, there were 1,187 people, 471 households, and 322 families living in the village. The population density was 1,253.4 people per square mile (482.4/km2). There were 502 housing units at an average density of 530.1 per square mile (204.0/km2). The racial makeup of the village was 98.06% White, 1.35% Native American, 0.34% from other races, and 0.25% from two or more races. Hispanic or Latino of any race were 0.84% of the population.

There were 471 households, out of which 31.0% had children under the age of 18 living with them, 56.5% were married couples living together, 8.3% had a female householder with no husband present, and 31.6% were non-families. 28.0% of all households were made up of individuals, and 12.5% had someone living alone who was 65 years of age or older. The average household size was 2.50 and the average family size was 3.07.

In the village, the population was spread out, with 24.2% under the age of 18, 9.6% from 18 to 24, 27.8% from 25 to 44, 22.4% from 45 to 64, and 16.0% who were 65 years of age or older. The median age was 37 years. For every 100 females, there were 102.6 males. For every 100 females age 18 and over, there were 95.7 males.

The median income for a household in the village was $41,300, and the median income for a family was $48,864. Males had a median income of $33,304 versus $24,135 for females. The per capita income for the village was $19,762. About 2.1% of families and 3.1% of the population were below the poverty line, including 2.1% of those under age 18 and 8.6% of those age 65 or over.

Notable people

Daniel Fischer, Wisconsin politician
Walter E. Gregory (1857-1918), physician
Thomas A. Sullivan, Wisconsin politician
Fred C. Maertz, Wisconsin politician

Images

References

External links

 Village of Reedsville
 Sanborn fire insurance maps: 1894 1900 1906 1913

Villages in Manitowoc County, Wisconsin
Villages in Wisconsin